Takenouchi Yasunori (1806 - March 3, 1867) was a Japanese Samurai Lord during Bakumatsu period. 

Takenouchi was governor of Shimotsuke Province, and in 1862 became the head of the Japanese mission to Europe. In 1864, he retired from active government service.

External links
Leszek Sosnowski, "Objects and ideas: Japan and Europe in the nineteenth century" MASKA 2017

1806 births
1867 deaths